Alma Zack (born 21 November 1970) is an Israeli actress.

Biography
Zack was born in Tel Aviv, Israel, in 1970 and grew up in Ramat Aviv. Her father is pianist Yonatan Zack and her mother is Adi Etzion, an actress and singer. She has a twin brother, Yoram, and an older brother, Dudi.

She attended the Herzliya Hebrew High School and served in the Israel Defense Forces as a psychotechnician. After her service, she studied acting at the Tel Aviv University, where her father taught music. She then worked as a flight attendant in El Al for a year. She played in a series and was an understudy in a play in the Gesher Theater.

In 2002, she had a role in the film The Wisdom of the Pretzel. She was auditioning for a program on Channel 1 when she was discovered by the editor of Eretz Nehederet, and joined the cast. In 2005 she joined the cast of Betipul, for which she shared the Israeli Television Award for best actress with Assi Levy (also for Betipul) in 2008. She also starred in the series I Didn't Promise You and Until the Wedding, and had a guest appearance on Mesudarim. In 2006 she sang on a Teapacks album.

In 2011 she played Ayelet in the Israeli television show Yellow Peppers.

Her partner is actor Alon Neumann.

References

External links

1970 births
Actresses from Tel Aviv
Herzliya Hebrew Gymnasium alumni
Tel Aviv University alumni
Israeli twins
Israeli television actresses
Israeli voice actresses
Living people